Nabataea is a song by German power metal band Helloween, and the first single from their album Straight Out of Hell. It was released on 9 January 2013.

Music video
The official music video for the song was released on January 15, 2013 through Sony Music Entertainment Germany GmbH.

Personnel
 Andi Deris - vocals
 Michael Weikath - guitars
 Sascha Gerstner - guitars
 Markus Grosskopf - bass guitar
 Daniel Loeble - drums

References

2013 singles
Helloween songs